Viola Léger  (June 29, 1930 – January 28, 2023) was an American-born Canadian actress and politician who served in the Senate of Canada from 2001 to 2005.

Born in Fitchburg, Massachusetts, Léger received a B.A. and a B.Ed. from the Université de Moncton, and an M.F.A. (Theater Education) from Boston University. As an actress, she was most noted for playing the title role in Antonine Maillet's play La Sagouine for both stage and television, performing the role over 3,000 times over the course of her career.

She was appointed to the Senate at the recommendation of Prime Minister Jean Chrétien, in 2001, representing the senatorial division of L'Acadie, New Brunswick. She was a member of the Liberal caucus. Léger retired from the Senate when she reached the age of 75.

Léger died in Dieppe, New Brunswick on January 28, 2023, at the age of 92.

Awards and honours
She was a Dora Mavor Moore Award winner for lead performance at the 1980 Dora Mavor Moore Awards for the production of La Sagouine at the Théâtre Français de Toronto.

In 1989, she was made an Officer of the Order of Canada. In 2007, she was awarded the Order of New Brunswick. Léger received a Governor General's Performing Arts Award in 2013 for her work as an actress.

References

External links
 
 
 

1930 births
2023 deaths
Acadian people
Actresses from New Brunswick
American emigrants to Canada
American people of French-Canadian descent
Boston University College of Fine Arts alumni
Canadian film actresses
Canadian television actresses
Women members of the Senate of Canada
Canadian senators from New Brunswick
Members of the Order of New Brunswick
Officers of the Order of Canada
People from Moncton
Politicians from Fitchburg, Massachusetts
Université de Moncton alumni
Women in New Brunswick politics
21st-century Canadian politicians
21st-century Canadian women politicians
Governor General's Performing Arts Award winners
Canadian stage actresses
20th-century Canadian actresses